One Life Crew (OLC) is a right wing straight edge hardcore band. They originally formed in Cleveland, Ohio in 1994. Though the band has had numerous members, the most notable line-up consisted of "Mean" Steve Murad (vocals), Blaze Tishko (guitar), John "Lockjaw" Tole (bass), and Tony "Chubby Fresh" Pines (drums). The band formed out of the ashes of Murad's former bands Confront and Mean Streak.

Beginning and Victory Records 

After releasing a series of demo tapes, the band was picked up by Victory Records and released their debut LP Crime Ridden Society on the label. OLC's songs attacked political correctness with controversial lyrics, notably on the track "Pure Disgust". OLC compared the track to anti-racist skinhead band, Agnostic Front's "Public Assistance". However, Crime Ridden Society's lyrics and liner notes also expressed overtly anti-immigrant sentiments deemed by many in the scene to be racist.

Pure Disgust lyrics: Don't come over here, We don't need or want you, A country for Americans, Vultures won't rule, In your rat land you belong and rot, D.P. worthless scums, Should all die enraged, Dirty fucking leaches, You must GET OUT, Don't use this country for free HAND OUTS, Bringing your infections, Don't infect our people, We pay out of our pockets not for your fucking free rides.

The band was dropped from Victory Records after a fight broke out during their surprise set at the 1996 Cleveland Hardcore Festival. Though many claims have been made as to the actual reason, OLC was dropped from the label. Victory's stance remains that they do not condone violence. Victory Records had 1,000 post cards printed explaining their decision, and mailed out to their customers. Allegedly, all remaining copies of Crime Ridden Society on cassette, CD, and vinyl were destroyed, making it a very sought-after album in collectors' circles.

Post-Victory 
In 1997, the band released their follow-up LP, entitled American Justice, on Too Damn Hype Records domestically, with Lost and Found Records having European distribution rights. Attempting to capitalize on their anti-PC image, the lyrical content was taken to the next level. Targets of the lyrics included corrupt law enforcement, Princess Diana, Jesse Jackson, Louis Farrakhan, David Duke and the Ku Klux Klan chastising illegal immigrants, and the unemployed. Aside from One Life Crew's songs, the album also included various skits, rap songs from Cleveland rapper Shady Shade, and four songs from the militant straight-edge band Pitboss 2000. Writing and recording of the album was extremely hectic and disorganized, with several of the songs written and/or played by people other than those who were credited for them. It was produced entirely for shock value, with the intentions of making a "white N.W.A album". The band played a few shows regionally to promote the album, then went on hiatus.

Reunions 2000-2012 
After only playing one show in 2001 in Youngstown, Ohio, with Pitboss 2000, the band returned in 2003, with only Steve Murad and Tony "Chubby Fresh" Pines remaining as original members. The band played under a half dozen shows, and released a greatest hits CD entitled 9-1-1, which included songs from Crime Ridden Society, American Justice, and a song by Pitboss 2000 ("Sell Out"). Once more, the band went on hiatus.

With the moderate success of the 2003 reunions, Prophecy Records obtained rights to and re-released the OLC demo tapes on both vinyl and CD. One demo was released under its original title, Reality Check, and the other was a split 7-inch with North Carolina right wing hardcore band, Empire Falls. Around this time, Tony Chubby Fresh Pines reformed a band with the name One Life Crew without any other original members. This, however, quickly fell apart.

In 2008, an album was released under the name of One Life Crew entitled 2KH8, which in actuality was just a demo of Chubby Fresh's other band, Heavyweight featuring Big Tyson, former lead guitarist of In Cold Blood, after Blaze and Popson left.

In 2009, Double Or Nothing Records announced that they would be releasing an anthology on CD titled It Is What It Is. One Life Crew once again reunited, this time with Murad and Pines being accompanied by Blaze Tishko, and Big Tyson.The band played two small shows to support the release, one in Cleveland, and the other in Philadelphia.

The show in Philadelphia was met with much controversy, with Anti-Racist Action voicing concerns to the venue about the racially prejudiced lyrical content of OLC. Rather than risk losing the venue for future events, the promoter, Joe Hardcore, and the band moved the show from the original venue to an undisclosed location within the city. Word of the show was spread via text messaging and emails to avoid any further controversy.

Double or Nothing Records is rumored to be releasing a new One Life Crew album in future. Reportedly, the majority of the material has already been written by the band.

In 2012 and 2013, OLC reunited once again and played East Coast Tsunami Fest each year. They have raised a Facebook page and are currently printing new merchandise. They also headlined the "Summer of Hate" show at The Grog Shop in Cleveland Heights, Ohio back in July 2013.

Members

Current
 "Mean" Steve Murad (vocals)
 Chris Mahmood (guitar)
 Ziggy (guitar)
 JF Murdario (bass)
 Tony "Chubby Fresh" Pines (drums)

Former
 John Lockjaw (bass/guitar)
 Randy Klammers (bass)
 Todd Thozeski (guitar)
 Lou Zario (guitar)
 Dannario (bass)
 Blue (vocals)
 Rye-Dawg (guitar)
 Soda Pop (drums)
 Big Tyson (guitar)
 Nate "The Crooner" Harkins (vocals/guitar)

Discography
 1996 Crime Ridden Society (VR28), (Victory Records)
 1998 Refuse 2 Fall/OLC split 7-inch
 1998 American Justice, (Too Damn Hype Records)
 2003 9-1-1, (self-released)
 2004 Reality Check, (Prophecy Records)
 2004 Necessary Vengeance - Empire Falls / OLC 7-inch, (Prophecy Records)
 2008 2KH8 (self-released)
 2009 It Is What It Is, (Double Or Nothing Records)

References

Hardcore punk groups from Ohio
Musical groups from Cleveland
Straight edge groups
Victory Records artists